Eois carmenta is a moth in the family Geometridae first described by Herbert Druce in 1892. It is found in Guatemala.

References

Moths described in 1892
Eois
Moths of Central America